The Enchanted Forest is a 1945 family film starring Edmund Lowe and Brenda Joyce, also featuring Harry Davenport as a hermit who finds and raises a young boy in a forest. The film and story served as the inspiration for a 1998 music composition/recording, "Enchanted Forest" by Loren Connors and Suzanne Langille.  It was filmed in Cinecolor and released by Producers Releasing Corporation.

Plot
A hermit, Uncle John, communicates with animals and cares for the forest. He is at odds with a forester who wants to cut down all the trees, and wants any impediments (like Uncle John and the boy) removed.

The child, Jackie, had been washed downstream after a trainwreck in a storm. The mother, Anne, whose father owns the land, is told that the child must be dead, but she cannot quite believe it. When she visits her father, and walks in to the forest, the boy catches sight of her, and she catches a glimpse of him as well. Through a series of interactions, the mother and child are reunited, the forest is saved, and Uncle John is able to stay.

Cast
Edmund Lowe as Steven Blaine
Brenda Joyce as Anne
William Severn as Jackie (Billy Severn)
Harry Davenport as Old John
John Litel as Ed Henderson
Clancy Cooper as Gilson
Jimmy the Crow as Blackie
Al Ferguson as Truck Driver (uncredited)

Color
The film was photographed in Cinecolor. The incredible, unexpected success of the film led to several major studios filming their own movies in the process.

Location
The film was shot on locations in Humboldt County, California.

References

External links

1945 drama films
1945 films
American drama films
Cinecolor films
Films directed by Lew Landers
Films set in forests
Producers Releasing Corporation films
1940s American films